Christopher Odetunde is a professor of Aeronautical and Mechanical Engineering. He has held various position in the industry and academia while in the United States and also in Nigeria. He is the former Dean of the Faculty of Engineering at the Kwara State University, Malete and the current Vice Chancellor of Augustine University.

Education 
Odetunde had his secondary education at St. John's College, Kaduna from 1964 to 1968, where he majored in the Arts. His switch to science subjects came at his A Levels, which he passed between 1969 and 1972.

He then went on to study Aeronautical Engineering at Embry-Riddle Aeronautical University in the United States. He earned other degrees at Iowa State University, Texas A& M University and Southeastern Institute of Technology, Alabama. He has a Bachelor of Science degree in Aeronautical Engineering, a Master of Science in Aeronautical/Mechanical Engineering and in Project Management, as well and a Doctoral degree in Aerospace Engineering.

Career 
Odetunde became Vice-Chancellor of Augustine University on 5 October 2020. Until his appointment, he was the former Dean of the Faculty of Engineering at the Kwara State University, Malete.

References 

Living people
Nigerian academic administrators
Obafemi Awolowo University alumni
Yoruba academics
Year of birth missing (living people)